Bulbophyllum shweliense is a species of orchid in the genus Bulbophyllum.
It is also commonly referred to as The Shweili Valley Bulbophyllum.

References
The Bulbophyllum-Checklist
The Internet Orchid Species Photo Encyclopedia

shweliense